Knežija is one of the older parts of Trešnjevka, Zagreb, Croatia. The area covered by the local city council Knežija has around 12,000 inhabitants.

Recently Knežija is being renewed. A lot of new buildings have been built and the looks of the old neighbourhood have almost disappeared.

The music ensemble Trešnjevka, headquartered in Knežija, has existed for more than 30 years, promoting the Croatian national, orchestral and vocal music and instrument called tambura.

References

Neighbourhoods of Zagreb
Trešnjevka